The Liverpool Giants are a set of giant marionettes built by French theatre company Royal de Luxe and displayed in a series of shows in Liverpool, in England.

The shows were:

 Sea Odyssey: Giants Spectacular in 2012, featuring their Little Girl, Uncle (Diver) and Dog (Xolo) giants
 Memories of August 1914 in 2014, featuring the Grandmother, Little Girl and Xolo
 Liverpool's Dream in 2018, featuring the Little Boy, Adult (Castaway) and Xolo

See also
 La Princesse, a giant mechanical spider shown in Liverpool in 2008 by French company La Machine

Liverpool